Annagh United Football Club (The name 'Annagh' ) is a semi-professional, Northern Irish football club playing in the NIFL Championship. The club, founded in 1963, hails from Portadown and plays its home matches at the BMG Arena. The club home colours are all red and away all white.

History
Tandragee Road has been the club's home since 1983. Indeed when the club opened its new pitch a Northern Irish star player of the time, the great George Best turned out in an Annagh United select side.

In the 2009–10 season however, the team finished near the bottom of the league and manager Wilkinson parted company with the club. In late July David Johnstone ex Loughgall caretaker manager was appointed manager. Johnstone played for Ards, Carrick Rangers, Larne and Loughgall. 
Recent seasons have brought some notable cup runs, none less than 2006–07 under the reign of Niall Currie, now boss at fellow Championship club Dundela, when they reached the Mid-Ulster Cup final against local senior club Newry City and the Irish Intermediate Cup Semi-final against Coagh United.  Annagh lost out to the latter in the Bob Radcliffe Cup semi-final earlier in that season.

Johnstone has since departed the club and the temporary management team of players Dean Smith, Darragh Peden and Alan Murphy took over. Dean Smith was  confirmed as manager for the 2013–14 season with Alan Murphy assistant and Darragh Peden coach. The club were promoted to the NIFL Championship 1 in the 2014–15 season and managed to survive for the 2016–17 season.

The club suffered greatly in their second season in NIFL Championship 1 suffering very heavy defeats to Institute, Dergview, Knockbreda and Warrenpoint Town with the club sitting rock bottom of Championship 1. They did, however, pull of a massive shock in the League Cup when they took on Glentoran and beat them 3-2 with Nacho Novo scoring his first goal for the East Belfast side in what was Alan Kernaghan's last game in charge of Glentoran.

2018–19 season saw the club under the leadership of Manager Ciaran McGurgan assisted with Simon Haffey as Assistant Manager and Coaches Paul Matchett, John Convery and Alan Murphy. It started well with the club sitting well in the league having been unbeaten from August 2018 to January 2019. They finished as league runners-up and competed with the PSNI from NIFL Championship in a two legged play off losing 5-3 on aggregate.

2019–20 season, the club started well. With 14 games played the club was top of the league on 33 points having recorded 10 wins and 3 draws but March 2020 brought the Coronavirus Pandemic, leading to all football being suspended. At the NIFL’s Board meeting on Monday 22 June, the Board determined that following the conclusion of the consultation process with all member clubs via Management Committees, and the appraisal of all season-end options, the current league season would be curtailed immediately. It was also determined that the NIFL would engage an independent football data consultancy to recommend and apply a mathematical model in order to determine final standings in each division. In June 2020 Annagh United where successfully crowned NIFL Premier Intermediate League Champions and promoted to the NIFL Championship.

With no league games for NIFL Championship or PIL Premiership teams and no fans allowed into games due to the ongoing Covid-19 situation it was decided to play the Irish Cup and the team in April 2021 played away to Linfield in the Irish Cup performing valiantly well in a 2-0 defeat.

2021-22 Annagh United finished the season 2nd place in the NIFL Championship behind winners Newry City and went into a play off match against close neighbours Portadown FC to be played over two legs, which drew large crowds to both matches resulting in Portadown winning 3-2 at the BMG Arena and 1-0 at Shamrock Park in the return leg to retain their NIFL Premiership status. Also Annagh reached the Mid Ulster Cup final in January 2022 losing 4-2 to Warrenpoint Town.

Current squad

External links
 Irish Football Club Project
 Irish Premier League Website
 Irish FA Website
 Irish League Supporters' Forums
 nifootball.co.uk (fixtures, results and tables of all leagues)

 

Former senior Irish Football League clubs
Association football clubs established in 1963
Association football clubs in Northern Ireland
Association football clubs in County Armagh
1963 establishments in Northern Ireland
NIFL Premier Intermediate League clubs